John Lewis (26 August 1919 – 2002) was an English professional footballer who played as a half-back in the Football League for Crystal Palace, Bournemouth and Reading. He also played non-league football for Kettering Town.

Playing career
Lewis was born in Walsall and began his youth career with West Bromwich Albion. He signed for Crystal Palace in the 1938 close season and made his debut – and only senior appearance before the league was interrupted by the Second World War – in April 1939 against Bristol Rovers. Lewis became a first team regular in the 1946–47 season, when he was ever-present and made over 30 appearances in each of the next two seasons. His form was such that he was named in a London select XI to play in Brussels in 1948.

However, in November 1949, Lewis was transferred to Bournemouth for £7,500 where he remained until July 1951, when he joined Reading. Lewis spent two seasons with Reading before moving into non-league football with Kettering Town.

Later career
After retiring as a player, Lewis became a publican.

Jack Lewis died in 2002, aged 82 or 83.

References

External links

Jack Lewis at holmesdale.net

1919 births
2002 deaths
Sportspeople from Walsall
English footballers
English Football League players
Association football midfielders
West Bromwich Albion F.C. players
Crystal Palace F.C. players
AFC Bournemouth players
Reading F.C. players
Kettering Town F.C. players
London XI players